RK Dračevo (HC Dračevo) is team handball club from Dračevo, Republic of North Macedonia. They compete in the First Macedonian handball league.

References

External links
Official Website

Macedonian Handball Federation

Dracevo
Kisela Voda Municipality